Maryam Modjaz is a German-American astrophysicist who is a professor and Director of Equity and Inclusion at the New York University. Her research considers the death of massive stars. She was awarded an Alexander von Humboldt Foundation Fellowship in 2018, which she spent at the Max Planck Institute for Astronomy.

Early life and education 
Modjaz grew up in Germany. It was as a child in Germany that she first looked through a telescope. She was an undergraduate student at the University of California, Berkeley. She completed an undergraduate research project under the supervision of Alex Filippenko, during which she studied Type Ia supernova. She was at the Lick Observatory when she made her first observation of a supernova. She became interested by the supernova that form from the deaths of very large stars. She moved to Harvard University for her graduate studies, where she worked on the deaths of massive stars (including Type II supernova). Her doctoral research was supervised by Robert Kirshner, and was recognized with the Fireman Prize as one of the most outstanding dissertations at the Center for Astrophysics  Harvard & Smithsonian.

Research and career 
Modjaz is interested in both experimental observations and theoretical predictions of star death. After graduating, she was made a Miller fellow at the University of California, Berkeley, where she worked alongside Filippenko and Joshua Bloom. She spent one year as a Hubble Postdoctoral Fellow at Columbia University. She was awarded the 2010 Ludwig-Biermann Award. Modjaz was appointed to the faculty at New York University in 2011, she where she joined the Center for Cosmology and Particle Physics. She was awarded an National Science Foundation CAREER Award in 2014. 

Modjaz has continued to study supernova with the Large Synoptic Survey Telescope.  In 2018 Modjaz moved to the Max Planck Institute for Astronomy, where she spent two years as a Alexander von Humboldt Foundation Fellow.

Selected publications

Personal life 
Modjaz is interested in science fiction.

References 

University of California, Berkeley alumni
Harvard Graduate School of Arts and Sciences alumni
New York University faculty
American astrophysicists
Women astrophysicists
Year of birth missing (living people)
Living people